The American Council for Polish Culture (ACPC) is a national non-profit, charitable, cultural and educational organization that serves as a network and body of national leadership among affiliated Polish-American cultural organizations throughout the United States.

History
Founded in 1948 in Detroit as the American Council of Polish Cultural Clubs, by early 2000s the Council currently represented the interests of some 35 to 40 affiliated organizations located in the United States. Its oldest affiliated organization, the Polish Arts Club of Chicago, was established in 1928.

ACPC is currently headquartered in Grosse Pointe Park, Michigan.

American Center of Polish Culture 
In 1989 the ACPC established the American Center of Polish Culture which opened its doors in 1991 in Washington, D.C.  The American Center of Polish Culture has, primarily, an educational function providing programs and exhibitions, but it also acts as a central point for the lobbying activities of the ACPC.  The first director, taking office in 1991, was Dr. Kaya Mirecka-Ploss, who was then president of the ACPC.

Awards, scholarships, etc.
Currently ACPC offers the following scholarship opportunities:

- The Eye of the Eagle:
Wladyslaw Zachariasiewicz Memorial Scholarship for American students of Polish descent, and those interested in Poland, pursuing a career in journalism and/or mass media communications.

- ACPC Summer Study Scholarship:
For American students of Polish descent to participate in a summer study program at any one of Poland's fine universities or other institutions that offer such programs.

- Pulaski Scholarship for Advanced Studies:
$5,000 for graduate students of Polish descent enrolled at an accredited university in the United States, who have completed at least one year of studies at the graduate level.

- Leonard Skowronski Polish Studies Scholarship:
For students pursuing some Polish studies (major may be in other fields) at universities in the United States, who have completed at least two years of college or university work at an accredited institution.

Affiliate organizations 
Connecticut
 Polish American Cultural Society of Stamford
 Polish Cultural Club of Greater Hartford

District of Columbia
 Polish American Arts Association of Washington DC

Florida
 Citrus County Polish Heritage Club
 American Institute of Polish Culture, Pinellas County

Illinois
 Polish Arts Club of Chicago

Indiana
 Chopin Fine Arts Club, South Bend

Massachusetts
 Polish Cultural Foundation, Boston

Michigan
 Friends of Polish Art, Detroit

Minnesota
 Polish American Cultural Institute of Minnesota

Missouri
 Polish American Society of Metro St. Louis

New Jersey
 Polish Arts Club of Trenton  Founded 1946

New York
 Kopernik Polish Cultural Society
 Kopernik Memorial Assoc. of Central New York
 Polish Arts Club, Elmira
 Polish Heritage Club of Syracuse, Inc.
 Polish Heritage Society of Rochester 

Ohio
 Cleveland Society of Poles
 Jamestown Colony of Poles, Cleveland
 Polish American Citizens Club of Akron
 Polish Arts Club of Youngstown 

Pennsylvania
 Polish Arts League of Pittsburgh
 Polish Heritage Society of Philadelphia

Texas
 Polish Heritage Center at Panna Maria

Virginia
 Polish American Society of Virginia

Wisconsin
 American Assoc. for Advancement of Polish Culture, Milwaukee

See also

Other similar organizations
 American Slav Congress, founded 1942
 Polish American Congress (PAC), founded 1945
 Polish American Council, founded 1939 merged into PAC in 1944
 The Kosciuszko Foundation,
 The Copernicus Foundation,
 Polish National Alliance, founded 1880

Notes

External links
 American Council for Polish Culture

European-American organizations
Non-profit organizations based in Illinois
Polish-American culture in Chicago
1948 establishments in the United States
Organizations based in Michigan